Chad Campbell (born March 5, 1973) is a former state representative from Arizona, who represented the 24th district and served as minority leader. He is a member of the Democratic Party.

Personal life and education
Campbell attended Moon Valley High School. Campbell graduated from Northern Arizona University in 1996, earning a B.S. in Environmental Science.

Political career
Campbell was elected to the Arizona House of Representatives in 2007, and served as the minority leader from 2010 through 2014. He served as ranking member on the Appropriations Committee. He left office in 2014.

In response to the 2011 Tucson shooting, Campbell proposed a legislative package that would increase background checks for gun purchasers and increase funding for mental health programs.

Along with moderate house Republicans, Campbell led his party in passing the Medicaid expansion advocated by Governor Jan Brewer, despite the opposition of Republican Speaker Andy Tobin.

Campbell is a senior vice president at Strategies 360 Consulting, working in their Phoenix office.

References

External links
 Campbell's Twitter account
 Chad Campbell at Project Vote Smart
 

1973 births
Living people
Politicians from Phoenix, Arizona
Northern Arizona University alumni
Businesspeople from Phoenix, Arizona
Democratic Party members of the Arizona House of Representatives